Larry Brodsky (born January 19, 1960) is a former American football wide receiver in the United States Football League (USFL) for the New Jersey Generals and Tampa Bay Bandits. He played college football at the University of Miami.

Early years
Brodsky attended Hialeah Miami Lakes high School. He accepted a football scholarship from the University of Miami. He finished his college career with 100 catches for 1,696 yards and 9 touchdowns, ranking fifth on the school's All-time receiving list.

Professional career
He was selected by the Kansas City Chiefs of the National Football League (NFL) in the 10th round of the 1982 NFL Draft, but never appeared in a regular season NFL game. 

He signed and instead played for the New Jersey Generals and Tampa Bay Bandits of the United States Football League (USFL).  In his third and final USFL season, he amassed 1,071 receiving yards and seven touchdowns.

Personal life
His father Joe Brodsky, was a coach in college football and in the NFL.

References

1960 births
Living people
Hialeah Senior High School alumni
Players of American football from Miami
American football wide receivers
Miami Hurricanes football players
New Jersey Generals players
Tampa Bay Bandits players